Plateaux Department may refer to:

Plateaux Department (Gabon)
Plateaux Department (Republic of the Congo)

See also

Plateau Department
Plateau (disambiguation)
 

Department name disambiguation pages